Blame My Roots Festival is an annual festival of country music in Morristown, Belmont County, Ohio. Founded by Chris Dutton, Nina Dutton, and Dino Giovannone, the annual festival debuted in 2019 when Jamboree in the Hills went on hiatus. The annual festival is held at the Valley View Campgrounds in Morristown, Ohio. The venue has hosted Jamboree in the Hills campers for 28 years and served as a venue for after parties. In the festivals debut year it showcased a variety of new, veteran, and legendary musicians on two different stages. Morristown is about 1½ hours west of Pittsburgh, and 20 minutes west of Wheeling, West Virginia.

In 2020, the Festival was canceled due to the COVID-19 pandemic concerns. The annual festival has announced its return slated for 2021.

History
The inaugural Blame My Roots Festival was held July 18–20, 2019

2019
The festival's first announced lineup featured headliners The Stickers on Thursday, July 18; Trace Adkins on Friday, July 19; and Tyler Farr on Saturday, July 20. The lineup included primarily country artists and bands.

The lineup, ordered as advertised on the festival's website, is as follows:
 Gypsy Cowboy
 Tim Ullom Band
 The Stickers
 Barnesville Community Alumni Band
 Walker Montgomery
 11/70 Band
 Whiskey Myers
 Dillon Carmichael
 Joe Diffie
 Trace Adkins
 Old Buddy Jack
 Jo Ann Jones
 Sydney Mack
 Joe Zelek
 Whey Jennings
 Gabby Barrett
 Ryan Hurd
 Lindsay Ell
 Kyle Daniel
 Tyler Farr
 Frank Vieira

2020 (canceled due to COVID-19 pandemic) 
Dates for the 2020 Blame My Roots Festival were Thursday, July 16 through Sunday, July 18. Artists that were scheduled to perform included:

 Justin Moore
 Neal McCoy
 Tracy Lawrence
 Jo Dee Messina
 Gone West (band) Ft. Colbie Caillat
 Black Stone Cherry
 Whey Jennings
 The Kentucky Headhunters
 Walker Montgomery
 Allie Colleen
 Thomas Gabriel
 George Shingleton
 11/70 Band

2021
Dates for the 2021 Blame My Roots Festival are Friday, July 16 through Sunday, July 17. Artists that are announced to perform include:
Friday: Neal McCoy, Joe Dee Messina, Adam Doleac, Walker Montgomery
Saturday: Miranda Lambert, Lee Brice, Tenille Townes, Niko Moon, Allie Colleen

References

External links
Official website

Country music festivals in the United States
Music festivals in Ohio
Music festivals established in 2019